MACD  is a trading indicator used in technical analysis of securities prices.

MACD may also refer to:

Science and technology
 MACD operations, in network and telecom support, MACD describes operations to Move, Add, Connect, or Disconnect/Delete a service